Tajuria is an Indomalayan genus of butterflies in the family Lycaenidae.

Species
Tajuria alangani  Schröder, Treadaway & Nuyda, 1993 Philippines
Tajuria albiplaga  de Nicéville, 1887
Tajuria androconia Z.G. Wang & Y. Niu, 2002
Tajuria arida Riley, 1923 
Tajuria berenis  Druce, 1896 
Tajuria cippus (Fabricius, 1798)
Tajuria caelurea  Nire, 1926
Tajuria culta (de Nicéville, [1896])
Tajuria cyrillus (Hewitson, 1865)
Tajuria deudorix (Hewitson, 1869)
Tajuria diaeus (Hewitson, 1865)
Tajuria discalis  Fruhstorfer, 1897
Tajuria dominus  Druce, 1895
Tajuria gui  Chou & Wang, 1994 China
Tajuria iapyx (Hewitson, 1865)
Tajuria igolotiana (Murayama & Okamura, 1973) Philippines
Tajuria illurgioides  de Nicéville, 1890  North India, Assam, Sikkim
Tajuria illurgis (Hewitson, 1869)
Tajuria inexpectata  Eliot, 1973 Sumatra, Borneo, Peninsular Malaya
Tajuria isaeus (Hewitson, 1865)
Tajuria ister (Hewitson, 1865)
Tajuria jalajala (C. & R. Felder, 1865)
Tajuria jehana  Moore, [1884]
Tajuria luculentus (Leech, 1890)
Tajuria lucullus  Druce, 1904 Borneo
Tajuria maculata (Hewitson, 1865)
Tajuria mantra (C. & R. Felder, 1860)
Tajuria matsutaroi  Hayashi, 1984
Tajuria megistia (Hewitson, 1869)
Tajuria melastigma  de Nicéville, 1887
Tajuria mizunumai H. Hayashi, 1978
Tajuria ogyges (de Nicéville, 1895)
Tajuria sebonga  Tytler, 1915 Manipur
Tajuria sunia  Moulton, 1911 Peninsular Malaya
Tajuria yajna (Doherty, 1886)

References

, 1897. Neue Rhopaloceren aus dem Malayischen Archipel Societas Entomologica  12(7):  49-50.
 , 2011: A new subspecies of Tajuria matsutaroi (Lepidoptera, Lycaenidae) from Leyte Is., the Philippines. Transactions of the Lepidopterological Society of Japan 62(1): 33-34. Abstract: .
 , 1967. The generic names of the butterflies and their type species (Lepidoptera: Rhopalocera). Bulletin of the British Museum (Natural History) 1967, Suppl. 9.
 , 1881. Lepidoptera of Ceylon Volume 1. L. Reeve & Co., London. 190 pp. 71 pls.
  & , 1996. a study of Tajuria discalis Fruhstorfer, 1897 (Lepidoptera: Lycaenidae) from Indonesia. Transactions of the Lepidopterological Society of Japan 47: 83-92.
  1996: A new subspecies of the genus Tajuria from Taiwan (Lepidoptera: Lycaenidae). Wallace 2: 6-7.
 , 1999: Zur kenntnis philippinischer Lycaenidae, 11. (Lepidoptera). Entomologische Zeitschrift 109 (4): 145-154.
 , 2006: Tajuria diaeus (Hewitson) (Lepidoptera: Lycaenidae) from North Sumatra with a description of a new subspecies. Butterflies (Teinopalpus) 43: 30-31.
 , 2012: Revised checklist of the butterflies of the Philippine Islands (Lepidoptera: Rhopalocera). Nachrichten des Entomologischen Vereins Apollo, Suppl. 20: 1-64.

External links
 Images representing  Tajuria  at Consortium for the Barcode of Life

 
Lycaenidae genera
Taxa named by Frederic Moore